Thorunna perplexa is a species of sea slug, a dorid nudibranch, a shell-less marine gastropod mollusk in the family Chromodorididae.

Distribution
This species is reported from south-eastern Australia and Tasmania.

References

Chromodorididae
Gastropods described in 1957